"Big Chief" is a song written by Earl King.

Big Chief may also refer to:

Music
Big Chief (American band), American funk rock band
Big Chief (British band), British jazz band
Big Chief Ellis, American blues pianist
Big Chief Russell Moore, American jazz trombonist
Big Chief Henry's Indian String Band, American string band
Big Chief!, a 1961 album by Junior Mance
Big Chief (Sunny Murray album), 1969

Other
Big Chief Bonner, American college football player
Big Chief Keen-eyed-Mole, a fictional character from The Adventures of Tintin
Big Chief tablet, a paper notebook brand
Big Chief Restaurant in Wildwood, Missouri, US
Big Chief, a nickname for William Howard Taft, the 27th president of United States